The 2002 Miller Lite 250 was the fourth round of the 2002 CART FedEx Champ Car World Series season, held on June 2, 2002 at the Milwaukee Mile oval in West Allis, Wisconsin.

Qualifying results

Race

Caution flags

Notes 

 Average Speed 129.583 mph

External links
 Qualifying Results
 Race Results
 Weather Information

Milwaukee
Milwaukee Indy 225
2002 in sports in Wisconsin